Dhiraj Bhattacharya (5 November 1905 - 1959) was an actor of Bengali and Hindi cinema who began in silent films. He was also a theater personality and writer.

Early life
Bhattacharya was born in a zamindar family of Panjia village, near Jessore, in British India. His father name was Lalit Mohan Bhattacharya. He entered Mitra Institution, Kolkata and passed matriculation in 1923. He studied in Ashutosh College to study literature but could not finish his studies. Bhattacharya joined the police service before becoming an actor.

Career
Bhattacharya started his acting career after joining Madan Theatre. His first film Sati Lakhsmi was released in 1925 but he first gained recognition from Charu Roy's movie Bengalee. He worked with Madhu Basu in Giribala, and acted in several detective and thriller films of Premendra Mitra. Bhattacharya was popular for his romantic performances as well as his innovative skills in portraying villainous characters. After becoming established as a film actor he turned to the theatre.

Filmography

 Sati Lakshmi (1925)
 Giribala (1929)
 Kal Parinaya (1930) as Manindra
 Mrinalini (1930)
 Annapurna (1932)
 Nauka Dubi (1932)
 Radha Krishna (1933 film)
 Krishnakanter Will (1932)
 Jamuna Puliney (1933) as lord Krishna
 Chand Saudagar (1934) as Lakhindar
 Daksha Yagna (1934) as Mahadev
 Chandragupta (1934)
 Satya Pathe (1935)
 Basabdatta (1935) as Upagupta
 Kanthahaar (1935) Gaourikanta
 Krishna Sudama (1936)
 Sonar Sansar (1936) as Raghu
 Bangalee (1936) as Nishith
 Khooni Kaun (1936)
 Balaa Ki Raat a.k.a. One Fatal Night (1936)
 Rajgee (1937) as Dwijesh
 Chinnahar (1937) as Loknath
 Abhinay (1938) as Hirak
 Sarbbajanin Bibahatsab  (1938) as Mathur
 Parasmani (1939) as  Bhabatosh
 Pathik (1939)
 Nara Narayan (1939) 
 Kumkum (1940) as  Chandan
 Kumkum The Dancer (1940)
 Byabadhan (1940) as Arun
 Rajkumarer Nirbasan (1940) as Kumar Prakash chandra/Naren
 Ahuti (1941)
 Epar Opar (1941) as Prabir
 Shakuntala (1941) as King Dushyant
 Banglar Meye (1941)
 Pashaan Debata (1942)
 Abhayer Biye (1942)
 Milan (1942)
 Dabi (1943)
 Dwanda (1943)
 Nilanguriya (1943)
 Samadhan (1943) as Lokesh
 Swamir Ghar (1943)
 Sahdhharmini (1943)
 Sahar Theke Dure (1943) as Doctor
 Wapas (1943) as  Rajan
 Irada(1944)
 Bideshini (1944)
 Kato Dur (1945)
 Mane Na Mana (1945)
 Sri Durga (1945)
 Mandir (1946)
 Natun Khabor (1947)
 Taruner Swapna (1948)
 Saankha Sindur (1948)
 Pratibad (1948)
 Banchita (1948)
 Joyjatra (1948)
 Kalo Chhaya (1948) as Dinanath/Rajiblochan
 Kuasha (1949)
 Bandhur Path (1949)
 Ekeyi Gramer Chhele (1950)
 Kankal (1950)  as  Abhay
 Kankantala light Railway (1950)
 Pathaharar Kahini (1950)
 Rakter Tan (1950)
 Kalsaap (1951)
 Chiner Putul (1951)
 Setu (1951)
 Niyoti (1951)
 Swapna o' samadhi (1952)
 Hanabari (1952)
 Dui Beyayi (1953)
 Ora Thake Odhare (1954) as Shibnath Babu
 Maraner Pare (1954)
 Moyla Kagaj (1954)
 Maa o' Chhele (1954)
 Sanjher Pradip (1955) as Tridip
 Dakinir Char (1955)
 Mahanisha (1956) as Aparna's Grandfather
 Amar Bou (1956)
 Shadhak ramprasad (1956)
 Adarsha Hindu Hotel (1957) as Hajari Thakur
 Neela Chole Mahaprabhu (1957)
 Bardidi(1957) as Mathur Babu
 Raat ekta (1957) 
 Bagha Jatin (1958)
 Manmoyee Girls School (1958)
 Dhumketu (1958)
 lilakanka (1958)
 Aparadh (1960)
 Gariber Meye (1960)

Bibliography
Bhattacharya published his autobiographical story in two parts, He also wrote a few story books:
 Jakhan Police Chilam
 Jakhan Nayak Chilam
 Mahua Milan
 Sajano Bagan
 Mon Nie Khela

References

External links
 
 

1905 births
1959 deaths
Bengali male actors
Indian male film actors
Male actors from Kolkata
Male actors in Bengali cinema
20th-century Indian male actors
Bengali writers